Duncan Pratt (born 21 September 1958) is an English former professional football player and manager. A defender, he played in the Netherlands for Haarlem and NEC. In April 2002 he left his position as manager of Fareham Town, and in June 2002 he began working for the marketing department of Spanish club Real Madrid. He later re-joined Fareham as manager, before again leaving in February 2009.

References

External links
 

1958 births
Living people
Association football defenders
English footballers
HFC Haarlem players
NEC Nijmegen players
Eerste Divisie players
Eredivisie players
English football managers
Fareham Town F.C. managers
Real Madrid CF non-playing staff
English expatriate footballers
English expatriate sportspeople in the Netherlands
Expatriate footballers in the Netherlands
English expatriate sportspeople in Spain